The Endeavour Recycled Clothing Thrift Store (trading as ERC) is a chain of thrift stores in Australia and is operated by the Endeavour Foundation. There are currently 26 stores in Queensland and New South Wales. The proceeds from the stores sales go towards supporting the work of the Endeavour Foundation.

References 

Charity shops
Charities based in Australia
Waste collection